The Journal of Architectural Education is a biannual peer-reviewed academic journal published by Routledge on behalf of the Association of Collegiate Schools of Architecture (ACSA). It was established in 1947 and the editor-in-chief is Marc J. Neveu (Woodbury University).

Editors
The following people have been editors-in-chief of the journal:

External links
 
 Journal page at publisher's website
 Print: 
 Online: 

Architecture journals
Taylor & Francis academic journals
Publications established in 1947
English-language journals
Biannual journals
Architectural education